In Greek mythology, Priasus (Ancient Greek: Πρίασος) may refer to two individuals:

 Priasus, one of the Argonauts and son of Caeneus. He was the brother of Phocus, another Argonaut.
 Priasus, commander of the Phrygians who fought in the war that Dionysus waged against the Indians.

Notes

References 

 Gaius Julius Hyginus, Fabulae from The Myths of Hyginus translated and edited by Mary Grant. University of Kansas Publications in Humanistic Studies. Online version at the Topos Text Project.
 Nonnus of Panopolis, Dionysiaca translated by William Henry Denham Rouse (1863-1950), from the Loeb Classical Library, Cambridge, MA, Harvard University Press, 1940.  Online version at the Topos Text Project.
 Nonnus of Panopolis, Dionysiaca. 3 Vols. W.H.D. Rouse. Cambridge, MA., Harvard University Press; London, William Heinemann, Ltd. 1940-1942. Greek text available at the Perseus Digital Library.

Dionysus in mythology